The Army and Navy Club is a private club located at 901 17th Street NW, Washington, D.C.  The Army and Navy Club Building is one of the tallest buildings in the city of Washington.

History

The club was founded in December 1885 as the United Service Club. At the time,  membership was limited to officers who had served during wartime. It had a few rooms in a building at the corner of F and 14th streets NW. A few years later, it extended its membership eligibility to all officers and ex-officers of the Army, Navy, and Marines.

The club changed its name to The Army and Navy Club in 1891. Its building was designed by Hornblower & Marshall and the construction was supervised by Albert L. Harris.
 The building was completed and officially opened on August 9, 1912.

In the mid-1980s, the interior of the building was gutted, although the facade was retained and the original chandeliers were saved. The building was also expanded with a high-rise section, and the work on the building was completed in February 1987. The expanded Club's dedication ceremony was scheduled for January 7, 1988, but it was delayed due to a snowstorm that dropped 10 inches of snow on the city. The dedication ceremony was rescheduled for on January 12, 1988, at which time President Ronald Reagan formally dedicated the building.

Building and facilities
The Army and Navy Club Library is one of the oldest private libraries in the District of Columbia. The library has close to 20,000 volumes and provides an outstanding source of information on military history and the latest news.

The club includes dining rooms, guest rooms, meeting rooms, squash facilities, and a gym.

As of July 2008, the structure stands as the 24th-tallest building in the city, tied in rank with 1620 L Street, 1333 H Street, 1000 Connecticut Avenue, the Republic Building, 1010 Mass, 1111 19th Street and The Watergate Hotel and Office Building. It was formerly a seven-story building, completed in 1912. The additions to the original building were designed by architectural firm Shalom Baranes Associates and was completed in 1987. The three basement levels are used as parking space, containing a 177-lot parking garage.

See also
List of tallest buildings in Washington, D.C.

References

External links

 

Clubs and societies in the United States
Gentlemen's clubs in the United States
Clubs and societies in Washington, D.C.
Buildings and structures completed in 1987
Skyscraper office buildings in Washington, D.C.
Clubhouses in Washington, D.C.
Skyscraper hotels in Washington, D.C.
1885 establishments in Washington, D.C.